Robert Middleton (1911–1977) was an American film and television actor.

Robert Middleton or variants may also refer to:

People

Robert Myddelton (born by 1526) (died 1567), MP for Denbigh Boroughs 1547
Robert Myddelton (died 1616) (c. 1563–1616) MP for Weymouth and Melcombe Regis 1604, City of London 1614
Robert Myddelton (1678–1733), MP for Denbigh Boroughs 1722–23
Robert Middleton of Caldhame, father of John Middleton, 1st Earl of Middleton
Robert Middleton (priest), executed March 1601 at Lancaster
Robert Tweedie Middleton (1831–1891), Scottish Liberal politician
R. Hunter Middleton (1898–1985), American book designer, painter, and type designer
Robert Middleton (footballer) (1903–?), Scottish international footballer
Bob Middleton (American football) on 1962 Ohio State Buckeyes football team
Bob Middleton (bowls), Australian lawn bowler

Other Uses
RFA Robert Middleton (A241), a 1938 Dundas class coastal stores carrier of the Royal Fleet Auxiliary

See also